Sohran or Sahran, also rendered as Sohrun or Sohrown, may refer to:
 Sohran, East Azerbaijan
 Sohran, Hamadan
 Sohran, Jask, Hormozgan Province
 Sohran, Minab, Hormozgan Province
 Sohran, Isfahan
 Sohran-e Olya, Kerman Province
 Sohran-e Sofla, Kerman Province
 Sohran-e Vosta, Kerman Province
 Sahran, Sistan and Baluchestan